The Julian M. Carroll Purchase Parkway is a controlled-access highway in the US state of Kentucky running from Fulton to Mayfield, near Kentucky Dam, for a length of . It begins at the Tennessee state line concurrent with U.S. Route 51 (US 51) only a few yards from an intersection with US 45W, US 45E, and US 45 at its southern terminus, and at I-69 just north of US 45 at its northern terminus. It is one of seven highways that are part of the Kentucky Parkway System. The parkway previously extended north from Mayfield to I-24 near Calvert City. However, in July 2018, this segment was replaced by an extension of I-69. The rest of the parkway south to the Tennessee border remains Future Interstate 69.

History

Federal legislation designated the entire length of the Purchase Parkway as I-69 in 2002.  On June 6, 2008, President George W. Bush signed HR 1195 (SAFETEA-LU Technical Corrections Act of 2008), reaffirming the I-69 designation for the Purchase Parkway and further authorizing Kentucky to sign the route as such with Federal Highway Administration (FHWA) approval.  The Kentucky Transportation Cabinet had planned I-69 signs on the parkway during the summer of 2008, but the FHWA required the KYTC to either upgrade substandard portions of the route or obtain a design waiver before the parkway could be signed as I-69.

On July 6, 2018, a 30-mile segment of the parkway was re-designated as Interstate 69, and the parkway was truncated to exit 21 in Mayfield The northernmost stub of the Purchase Parkway between I-24/I-69 and US-62 is now signed as "TO US-62" in the northbound direction and "TO I-24/I-69" in the southbound direction.

Originally named Purchase Parkway for the Jackson Purchase area it diagonally traverses, the road was renamed for Julian M. Carroll, a former Kentucky governor from McCracken County, in 2001. The Purchase Parkway carries the unsigned designation of Kentucky Route 9003 (JC 9003).  The Mayfield Bypass, which was incorporated into the parkway following its construction, is also signed as US 45 Bypass.

As a toll road 
Except for the Mayfield bypass which remained free, the parkway was originally a toll road, as were all Kentucky parkways. State law requires that toll collection cease when enough tolls are collected to pay off the parkway's construction bonds; which in the case of the Purchase, occurred in 1992.

Toll locations and charges

Future
The Julian M. Carroll Purchase Parkway from the junction with Interstate 24 west was legally designated to become part of I-69. On May 15, 2006, Governor Ernie Fletcher announced that the Purchase Parkway would become part of the alignment of I-69 in Kentucky, along with parts of I-24, the Edward T. Breathitt Pennyrile Parkway, and the Wendell H. Ford Western Kentucky Parkway. To reflect this, Future I-69 shields were erected along the parkway in the middle of 2006.  Additional federal legislation enacted in 2008 confirmed the route of I-69, and authorized Kentucky to immediately begin signing the Purchase Parkway (and parts of the Western Kentucky Parkway and Pennyrile Parkway) as I-69, even though the parkways did not yet meet Interstate Highway standards.

The reason the 2008 legislation (HR 1195) immediately applied the I-69 designation to the Purchase Parkway was to tap into federal Interstate Highway money to fund upgrades to the parkway. This is because Interstate Highway funds typically could not be used to upgrade an existing freeway until it is designated and signed as an Interstate. No official funding has been set in the six-year plan stipulating modernization of the parkways that will be affected by I-69's routing, nor has any official study been completed.

Because Kentucky is using an existing expressway for I-69, highway officials will likely avoid years of costly environmental studies required by other states, as the upgrades are being performed within the footprint of the existing highway.

Funding remains the big issue for upgrading the parkways to I-69, as there is no funding in the state's 2006 Six-Year Transportation Plan specifically for I-69.  However, it is likely that Kentucky will perform the required upgrades on individual segments of the Purchase Parkway when the pavement reaches the end of its lifespan, through "Pavement Preservation Projects."  This approach is similar to the way New York is upgrading its substandard Route 17 Expressway to I-86.

A project to extend I-69 from Mayfield to Fulton is scheduled for completion in 2024. The rest of the parkway will be designated as I-69 afterwards.

Exit list

References

External links

Julian M. Carroll Purchase Parkway at KentuckyRoads.com
Exit list for Purchase Parkway

 

9003
Interstate 69
Kentucky parkway system
Transportation in Fulton County, Kentucky
Transportation in Graves County, Kentucky
Transportation in Marshall County, Kentucky